Il conte Tacchia, internationally released as Count Tacchia, is a 1982 Italian comedy film directed by Sergio Corbucci.

The main character of the film is inspired by the real count Tacchia, Adriano Bennicelli.

Plot 
In 1910 in Rome, the poor carpenter Francesco, by a twist of fate, is recognized as a member of a noble family in the process of decay. Francesco knows the cynical and ruthless Prince Torquato Terenzi, disappointed by life and progress, and also falls in love with the beautiful Duchess Elisa. 

When Prince Terenzi dies, Francesco realizes that he is not enriched by the inheritance, because the noble family is broke; so he enlists himself for the Italo-Turkish War in Libya, but quickly returns to Italy, disgusted by the atrocities of the fighting.

Cast 

Enrico Montesano: Francesco Puricelli / Count Tacchia
Vittorio Gassman: Prince Torquato Terenzi
Zoé Chauveau: Fernanda Toccacieli
Paolo Panelli: Mastro Alvaro Puricelli
Giuseppe Pambieri: Marquis Lollo D'Alfieri
Ninetto Davoli: Ninetto
Ania Pieroni: Duchess Elisa Savelli
Claudio Gora: Duke Saverio Savelli
Lia Zoppelli: Duchess Savelli
Riccardo Pizzuti: Tomegaux 
Anita Durante: Grandmother of Fernanda

See also        
 List of Italian films of 1982

References

External links

1982 films
Italian comedy films
1982 comedy films
Films directed by Sergio Corbucci
Films scored by Armando Trovajoli
Films set in 1900
Films set in Rome
Films shot in Rome
Films with screenplays by Sergio Donati
Films with screenplays by Luciano Vincenzoni
Italo-Turkish War
Films about nobility
1980s Italian-language films
1980s Italian films